Eubelidae is a family of isopods belonging to the order Isopoda. It contains the following genera:
Aethiopopactes Ferrara & Taiti, 1982
Ambounia Dollfus, 1895
Angaribia Barnard, 1932
Ankaratridium Paulian de Félice, 1950
Aschismatius Verhoeff, 1942
Atracheodillo Arcangeli, 1950
Benechinus Budde-Lund, 1910
Congethelum Ferrara & Schmalfuss, 1985
Dioscoridillo Ferrara & Taiti, 1996
Elumoides Taiti & Ferrara, 1983
Ethelum Budde-Lund, 1899
Ethelumoides Ferrara & Taiti, 1989
Eubelinum Taiti, 2014
Eubelum Budde-Lund, 1885
Gelsana Budde-Lund, 1910
Hiallelgon Paulian de Félice, 1945
Hiallides Richardson, 1909
Hiallum Budde-Lund, 1899
Ignamba Budde-Lund, 1910
Kameruthelum Verhoeff, 1942
Kenyoniscus Schmölzer, 1974
Kivudillo Ferrara & Taiti, 1976
Koweitoniscus Vandel, 1975
Lobethelum Ferrara & Taiti, 1989
Mesarmadillo Dollfus, 1892
Metaperiscyphops Ferrara & Schmalfuss, 1976
Microcercus Budde-Lund, 1910
Myrmecethelum Verhoeff, 1942
Omanodillo Taiti, Ferrara & Davolos, 2000
Oropactes Ferrara & Taiti, 1982
Orothelum Paoli, Ferrara & Taiti, 2002
Panningillo Verhoeff, 1942
Paraperiscyphops Ferrara & Schmalfuss, 1976
Parelumoides Ferrara & Schmalfuss, 1983
Periscyphis Gerstaecker, 1873
Periscyphoides Arcangeli, 1950
Periscyphops Hilgendorf, 1893
Pseudoaethiopopactes Ferrara, 1974
Rufuta Taiti & Ferrara, 1981
Saidjahus Budde-Lund, 1904
Schoutedenillo Arcangeli, 1950
Somalodillo Taiti & Ferrara, 1982
Somalodilloides Taiti & Ferrara, 2004
Somaloniscus Ferrara & Taiti, 1996
Stegosauroniscus Schmölzer, 1974
Synarmadilloides Nobili, 1906
Tritracheodillo Ferrara & Taiti, 1982
Trogleubelum Arcangeli, 1950
Tropethelum Verhoeff, 1942
Xeroniscus Ferrara & Taiti, 1990

References

Isopoda
Crustacean families